KDBI (730 AM) is a radio station in Boise, Idaho. The station is currently owned by Kevin Terry, through licensee Radio Rancho, LLC.

History
The station signed on the air in 1955 as KYME at 740 kHz. In 1984 it became KTOX and moved to the current 730 kHz frequency.  It became KBSU with a jazz format in 1992. However, in 2011, it was sold to Impact Radio Group for $165,000. The station was previously operated by Boise State University. On July 21, 2011, Impact changed the calls to KINF and adopted a conservative-leaning news-talk format.  It simulcast the first two hours of America's Morning News with KINF-FM, as well as KINF-FM's entire weekend schedule.

On January 1, 2013, after a few days of stunting with a loop of "Thriller" by Michael Jackson, KINF split from the simulcast with KINF-FM and flipped to sports, with programming from ESPN Radio.

On April 30, 2013, KINF began simulcasting on translator K243BM (96.5 FM).

On October 1, 2013, KINF changed their call letters to KNFL.

On February 24, 2017, KNFL began stunting once again with a loop directing listeners to KQBL-HD2 and translator K256CZ (99.1 FM), as the "ESPN Boise" sports format moved to those frequencies. The station changed its call sign to KDBI on March 10, 2017.

Effective May 31, 2017, Kevin Terry's Radio Rancho, LLC purchased KDBI and translators K224EP and K294DC from Impact Radio Group in exchange for the license to translator K256CZ and $35,000. On June 5, 2017, KDBI ended stunting and began simulcasting Regional Mexican-formatted KDBI-FM 106.3.

Previous logo

References

External links
FCC History Cards for KDBI
La Gran D Boise Facebook

DBI (AM)
Radio stations established in 1955
1955 establishments in Idaho